Soul Supreme (real name David Åström), born 1983, is a hip hop producer from Sweden. He has worked with the likes of KRS-One, Pete Rock and Big Daddy Kane. In 2003 he released his debut and self-produced album “The Saturday Night Agenda” under the name Soul Supreme on the Boston-based label Grit Records. The album featured KRS-One, Big Daddy Kane, Pete Rock, O.C. and many more. Later the same year he produced the entire mixtape "Soulmatic", a remixed version of Nas classic album "Stillmatic", which was released through hiphopsite.com. In 2004 he continued with another remix mixtape; Soul & Sense containing remixes on early Common material when Common still called himself Common Sense. This was in 2005 released on Nocturne as a CD entitled “Uncommonly Nasty: Remixed By Soul Supreme & Statik Selektah”. In 2006 he made URB Magazine’s list of the next 100 producers His production borrows heavily from, often pitched-up, soul samples; hence the name. He is signed to JuJu Publishing. Soul Supreme also makes more electro themed music (his own name of this style is rapclash) under the name Kocky. In 2007, Soul Supreme released an electro-house album called "Kingdome Come" under his alias Kocky. The album was released by La Vida Locash and features guest appearances by Timbuktu, Chords, Mapei, and Jens Lekman.

Albums 
 As Soul Supreme
 Soulmatic (2002)
 Instrumental 4 the Mind, Body and Soul (2003)
 The Saturday Nite Agenda (2003)
 Soul & Sense (2004)

 As Kocky

 Kingdom Came (2007)
 Stadium Status (2008)

References

External links 

Swedish record producers
Living people
1983 births